Steve Brotherstone (born 16 April 1971) is a former professional rugby union player who won eight caps for Scotland 1999-2002. He played at hooker and his career included appearances for Edinburgh Reivers, Brive, Newcastle Falcons, Northampton Saints and Gloucester Rugby.

Early life
Brotherstone was born 16 April 1971 in Duns.

Club rugby
In 1998 when the Scottish Rugby Union (SRU) formed super-districts, Brotherstone signed for Edinburgh Reivers.

In 2000 appeared in French Cup final for Brive.

In 2002 he joined Newcastle Falcons on loan.

In 2002 he was signed by Gloucester Rugby.

International career
Brotherstone made his debut for Scotland against Ireland at Murrayfield on 20 March 1999.

He played on the 2000 tour of New Zealand. In November 2000, after playing in seven tests, he was dropped to the Scotland A side. He returned for a final appearance for Scotland on a tour of North America as a substitute against Canada at Vancouver on 15 June 2002.

In 2004 he retired from his playing career.

References

1971 births
Living people
CA Brive players
Edinburgh Rugby players
Gloucester Rugby players
Newcastle Falcons players
Northampton Saints players
Rugby union hookers
Rugby union players from Duns, Scottish Borders
Scotland international rugby union players
Scottish expatriate rugby union players
Scottish expatriate sportspeople in France
Scottish rugby union players